Events from the year 1483 in France

Incumbents
 Monarch – Louis XI (until August 30), then Charles VIII

Events

Births

Full date missing
Jacquet of Mantua, composer (died 1559)
Robert Céneau, bishop and historian (died 1560)

Deaths

30 August – Louis XI of France (born 1423).

Full date missing
Guillaume d'Estouteville, monk, bishop and cardinal (born 1403/1412)
Charlotte of Savoy, queen consort (born 1441)
Yolande, Duchess of Lorraine (born 1428)

See also

References

1480s in France